Karl Faymonville (31 August 1875 – after 1927) was a German art historian.

Life and career 
Born in Aachen, Faymonville, son of the factory owner Johannes Faymonville, attended a grammar school in Aachen. He studied art history and architecture at the Polytechnische Schule zu Aachen (1894–96), the Karlsruhe Institute of Technology (1896-97), the Technical University of Munich and the Ludwig Maximilian University of Munich (1897–98). From 1898, he studied at the Ruprecht-Karls-Universität Heidelberg, where he received his doctorate in 1899. He became a member of the Corps Marko-Guestphalia Aachen in Aachen.

Publications 
 Die Purpurfärberei der verschiedenen Kulturvölker des klassischen Altertums und der frühchristlichen Zeit. Beschreibung und Abbildung der verschiedenen Arten, scalae, des Purpurs, desgleichen von heute noch erhaltenen gemusterten Purpurgeweben im Abendlande. Dissertation, Ruprecht-Karls-Universität Heidelberg, 1900. (with résumé)
 Zur Kritik der Restauration des Aachener Münsters. Beschreibende Darstellung der ältesten Abbildungen seines Inneren. Aachener Verlags- und Druckerei-Gesellschaft, Aachen 1904. (MDZ München)
 Der Dom zu Aachen und seine liturgische Ausstattung vom 9. bis zum 20. Jahrhundert. Kunstgeschichtliche Studie. Bruckmann, Munich 1909.
 Die Kunstdenkmäler der Stadt Aachen., vol. 10.)
 Volume 1: Das Münster zu Aachen. (Die Kunstdenkmäler der Rheinprovinz, vol. 10, 1.) Schwann, Düsseldorf 1916.
 Volume 2: Die Kirchen der Stadt Aachen mit Ausnahme des Münsters. (Die Kunstdenkmäler der Rheinprovinz, vol. 10, 2.) Schwann, Düsseldorf 1922.
 with Joseph Lauren, Richard Pick, Max Schmid-Burgk) vol. 3: Die profanen Denkmäler und die Sammlungen der Stadt Aachen. (Die Kunstdenkmäler der Rheinprovinz,vol. 10, 3.) Schwann, Düsseldorf 1924.
 Die Kunstdenkmäler des Kreises Monschau. (Die Kunstdenkmäler der Rheinprovinz, vol. 11, 1.) Schwann, Düsseldorf 1927.

References

External links 
 
 Werke von Karl Faymonville in the OPAC; 

German art historians
1875 births
20th-century deaths
Year of death missing
Date of death missing
People from Aachen